The 2012 Sydney Motorsport Park 360 was a motor race for the Australian sedan-based V8 Supercars. It was the ninth event of the 2012 International V8 Supercars Championship. It was held on the weekend of 25–26 August at the Sydney Motorsport Park, in Eastern Creek, New South Wales.

It was the first V8 Supercars event held at the circuit since 2008, when the circuit was known as Eastern Creek Raceway. The V8 Supercars used the traditional 3.93 km Gardner Circuit as opposed to the new 4.7 km Brabham Circuit. It was also the first of three events held in New South Wales and the last before the endurance races (the Sandown 500, Bathurst 1000 and Gold Coast 600).

Standings
 After 19 of 30 races.

References

Sydney Motorsport
Motorsport at Eastern Creek Raceway
Sports competitions in Sydney